RK Vitez is a Bosnian rugby club based in Vitez.

External links
BiH klubovi - RUGBY.ba - Službena web stranica Ragbi Saveza BiH (in Bosnian)

Bosnia and Herzegovina rugby union teams